Johanne Morissette Daug Amon-Lamar (born June 2, 1996), known professionally as Morissette and frequently also referred to as Morissette Amon, is a Filipino singer and songwriter. She first rose to prominence when she was the runner-up on TV5's Star Factor at the age of 14. In 2012, she made her professional stage debut in the Repertory Philippines stage adaptation of Disney's Camp Rock in the role of Mitchie Torres. She competed in the first season of ABS-CBN's The Voice of the Philippines in 2013, where she became part of Sarah Geronimo's team.

Morissette was born and raised in Minglanilla, Cebu. She became part of ABS-CBN' s Sunday afternoon show, ASAP in January 2014, and was introduced as one of the "Homegrown Divas", which ultimately became ASAP's "Birit Queens". She became a recording artist of Star Music in early 2014 and released her first album, titled Morissette, in March 2015. In 2017 Filipino Star Magazine called her "The Next Big Diva".

Morissette has often been referred to as "Asia's Phoenix" since her performance at the 14th Asia Song Festival in Busan, South Korea, on September 24, 2017, where she represented the Philippines. She returned to the same festival to represent the Philippines at the 15th Asia Song Festival in Busan on October 3, 2018. She was the first Filipino artist to have her own V Live channel, a popular South Korean live video streaming service for celebrities.

Morissette debuted on the Pandora Predictions Chart, and on December 22, 2020, she debuted at number 7 on the Next Big Sound chart, the first female OPM artist to do so. She began to write and produce her own songs with her fiancé, Dave Lamar, in 2020. The two wed in 2021.

Life and career

2010–2012: Career beginnings and TV5's Star Factor
Johanne Morissette Daug Amon, also known as Morissette, was born on June 2, 1996, in Cebu City, Philippines, to her mother Analie Daug and father Amay Amon. She is the oldest child and has one sibling, Jeremy Mattheu Amon. She studied at Immaculate Heart of Mary Academy in Minglanilla, Cebu. Her father is a rock musician. Her name "Johanne", which is pronounced as "Yohan", was coined by her father from German composer Johann Sebastian Bach, while "Morissette" was taken from her father's favorite singer, Alanis Morissette. She was 3 years old when her family discovered her talent in singing. When she was left alone with a karaoke machine, she sang the Regine Velasquez song, "You Are My Song". As she grew up, she sang Jessa Zaragoza songs like "Paano Kaya".

In her first singing contest held by a radio station in Cebu, she sang Christina Aguilera's "Reflection". Thereafter she became a frequent singing contestant in Cebu, joining competitions such as Young Star Singing Idol. At 9 years of age, she became a finalist in the Little Division of Little Big Star Cebu. She also did front acts in mall tours for different artists like Sarah Geronimo and Kim Chiu, among others, in Cebu. Morissette is known to execute a whistle register and expressed she got this inspiration from another Filipina singer Nina Girado. Growing up, her other musical influences include Regine Velasquez and Sarah Geronimo.

At the age of 14, she competed on TV5's Talentadong Pinoy and immediately exit the competition but was highly endorsed by the chairman of the board of judges to join an upcoming reality star search. She then entered a production deal with production team Muller and Patton (Jaye Muller, Ben Patton) to record 14 songs written by them for Morissette. Those songs were not then released officially but appeared as pirate releases online; they were later officially released in two volumes on November 20, 2020, and March 21, 2021. After Talentadong Pinoy, Morissette then was asked to join the new Artista Search of TV5, the Star Factor. Because of her strong desire to become a singer and performer, she auditioned in Cebu, where the judges picked her as one of the finalists. She then moved to Manila together with her mother to compete in the finals. She reached the top 4 and then was the first runner-up to Eula Caballero, the Star Factor winner. Talent manager David Cosico offered to manage her career on TV5. She eventually appeared in several TV5 shows, such as Kapitan Awesome and Cassandra: Warrior Angel.

In 2012, Morissette played the lead role of Mitchie Torres in the Repertory Philippines production of Disney's Camp Rock: The Musical. The production ran at Onstage, Greenbelt 1, Makati City from November 16 until December 16, 2012. Rehearsing and performing in the musical took its toll on Morissette's voice, and she was diagnosed with vocal cord nodules. Morissette's last project at TV5 was Cassandra: Warrior Angel.

2013: The Voice of the Philippines

Morissette's work at TV5 supported her family financially, but she wanted to pursue a singing career. She decided to join ABS-CBN's new singing competition, The Voice of the Philippines. During the blind auditions, Morissette sang "Love On Top"; and with her strong vocals she instantly made it to be part of Team Sarah Geronimo. She progressed into the live shows, as Geronimo chose her over teammate Lecelle Trinidad when they both sang "No More Tears (Enough Is Enough)" during the Battle Rounds.

During the first live show of The Voice of the Philippines Morissette sang "Jar of Hearts". She received the highest percentage of votes in Geronimo's team, with 57.16%, and advanced to the next level of the competition. For the second live show, Morissette sang "What About Love", and Geronimo picked her over former South Border member Maki Ricafort, scoring her 60% for her performance. Added to her public vote of 50.41% her total score of 110.41 points advanced her to the next round. During the semi-finals, she sang Jessie J's "Who You Are", losing to teammate Klarisse De Guzman, and was eliminated.

2014: Transfer to ABS-CBN
In 2014 Morissette started recurring appearances on ABS-CBN's ASAP. For the drama series Moon of Desire, she recorded the self-titled theme song by Trina Belamide. This was followed by more theme songs on ABS-CBN's "teleseryes". Together with her former teammate from The Voice of the Philippines, De Guzman and Angeline Quinto, she was given a segment on ASAP called "HD" or "Homegrown Divas". She also started performing in It's Showtime, ABS-CBN's noontime variety show, where she was allowed to sing solo numbers. This show provided Morissette an opportunity to demonstrate both her singing and dancing skills. She was accused of lip-syncing Ariana Grande's "Break Free" after the hosts of the show praised her for keeping her voice steady while dancing across the stage. Morissette denied the accusation.

In May 2014, Morissette gave her first solo concert entitled This Is Me, which doubled as her 18th birthday celebration. Her repertoire included international pop hits, as well as those from Philippine singers such as Regine Velasquez. She even paid homage to her namesake by singing her own versions of Alanis Morissette's "Ironic" and "You Learn". During this concert she announced that she had joined Star Records, with which she signed a one-year contract in August 2014. Morissette had the opportunity to perform with Jessie J at her concert on July 14, 2014, at Smart Araneta Coliseum. She was interviewing Jessie J for the music channel Myx and mentioned that she sang one of her songs on The Voice of the Philippines. Jessie J then requested Morissette to sing for her, and Morissette sang part of "Who You Are". Jessie J immediately invited Morissette to join her onstage during her concert.

In September 2014, Morissette performed in the 2014 finals of Himig Handog P-Pop Love Songs, the country's most popular songwriting and music video competition. She interpreted "Akin Ka Na Lang", an original song written by Francis Louis "Kiko" Salazar which was chosen as one of the 15 finalists out of more than 6,000 entries submitted since November 2013. In November 2014, Morissette sang several Disney songs in a two-day concert entitled Disney in Concert: A Tale as Old as Time, along with Sam Concepcion and Karylle, accompanied by the ABS-CBN Philharmonic Orchestra under the direction of Gerard Salonga.

2015–2019: First album Morissette; Recognition as "Asia's Phoenix"
In March 2015, Star Records released her first studio album, the self-titled album, Morissette. The carrier single, "Di Mapaliwanag" was used as a theme song for the Koreanovela, My Lovely Girl on Kapamilya ABS CBN and won as Asianovela Themesong of the Year (2015). The album was launched at Shangri-La Plaza EDSA on April 12, 2015, and eventually reached platinum status.

Morissette sang theme songs for big movies under Star Cinema including a cover of Starship's hit song "Nothing's Gonna Stop Us Now" with Daniel Padilla for the film Crazy Beautiful You starring Padilla and Kathryn Bernardo and "Someone's Always Saying Goodbye" for the film You're Still the One starring Dennis Trillo, Maja Salvador, Ellen Adarna and Richard Yap. In 2016 she performed a duet with Piolo Pascual entitled "Something I Need" for the movie Everything About Her starring Angel Locsin, Xian Lim and Vilma Santos.

In mid-2015, she was tapped to be one of the main casts in Chuva Choo Choo – Mr. Kupido Musicale featuring the songs of Mr. Vehnee Saturno. She played Darla, who along with her sister Dina (played by Joanna Ampil) are talented amateur singers hoping to break into the entertainment business.

Morissette was awarded as the Best New Female Recording Artist at the 2015 PMPC Star Awards for Music. She was also recognized by the National Consumer Affairs Foundation's Seal of Excellence Awards as the 2015 Outstanding Female Performing Artist of the Year.

In December 2015, she performed a mini-concert at the 26th St. Bistro, Coffee Bean and Tea Leaf produced by Stages Sessions. Singing to acoustic accompaniment, she covered several artists such as Jessie J, Rihanna and Nina.

Morissette also was part of the concert Confessions: A Night of Secrets, Stories and Songs in February 2016 at the Music Museum by the Stages Sessions.

She was awarded at the 1st Wish 107.5 Music Awards (WMA) as Female Artist of the Year for 2016. Winners in WMA's major award categories were allowed to choose beneficiaries of financial assistance worth Php 100,000. Morissette's choice was Home for the Angels in Santa Ana, Manila, a crisis center for abandoned infants. She commended this unique aspect of the event and shared "I feel blessed because last year I've won awards but they recognized me as a new artist. This one is different because I'm giving away to a beneficiary ... not just winning for myself".

For the second time, she performed in the 2016 Himig Handog P-Pop Love Songs competition. She interpreted "Diamante", composed by Jungee Marcelo.

Morissette is a regular on ABS-CBN's Sunday afternoon show ASAP, as one of the Birit Queens. Other members of this group include Angeline Quinto, Klarisse de Guzman, and Jonalyn Viray. There were speculations that the individual members of the group tried to outshine each other. Morissette stated in an interview that ASAP assigned them songs to sing and that the group worked together for the various song numbers. She further clarified that when it was her turn she would give her all, but during the time the group merged voices they should blend together. On January 22, 2017, it was announced the group would stage their first concert, which was held on March 31, 2017, at the SM Mall of Asia Arena. The group disbanded in late 2017, but had a reunion on June 2, 2019, as part of her birthday production number.

She was awarded as the Female Artist of the Year by ABS-CBN's M.O.R. Pinoy Music Awards in 2016.

Morissette held her first major concert at the Music Museum on the August 13, 2016. During this sold-out show, she sang a combination of old and new songs, including Beyoncé's "Love On Top", which she had sung during her blind audition for The Voice, Barbra Streisand's "Papa, Can You Hear Me?", as well as Basil Valdez's "Iduyan Mo", and her singles, "'Di Mapaliwanag" and "Throwback". Her performance of "I'm Here" from the musical The Color Purple garnered praise from Lea Salonga, who said that she sang the song with authority. Prior to the concert Morissette stated that she wanted to break free from her stereotype as a belter and show her skill in dancing as well as demonstrating her softer side.

She topped the 2017 2nd Wish 107.5 Music Awards with a total of eight awards, more than any artist nominated. Morissette won all six categories she was nominated in, and joined the Wishclusive Elite Circle with two Bronze Awards for her version of Mariah Carey's "Against All Odds" and Little Mix's "Secret Love Song". It is awarded to any Wish 107.5 artist garnering at least 10 million YouTube views. Four of her awards were for her cover of "Secret Love Song", which became popular and reached 1 million YouTube views within a week after it premiered. As of February 2017 this performance was the first to hit 25 million views in Wish 107.5's YouTube channel, and has guaranteed Morissette at least a Silver WISHclusive Elite Circle award for the next WMA.

Morissette has often been referred to as "Asia's Phoenix" since her performance at the 14th Asia Song Festival in Busan, South Korea on September 24, 2017, where she represented the Philippines. She returned to the same festival to represent the Philippines in the succeeding 15th Asia Song Festival in Busan on October 3, 2018.

In February 2018, Morissette had her biggest concert to date which was called "Made". The highlight of the concert was the introduction of her idol, Regine Velasquez, who joined her for an emotional duet of Morissette's hit "Akin Ka Na Lang". Morissette's Wishclusive performance of Secret Love Song has garnered over 100 million views on YouTube, making Morissette the first Female OPM singer to reach that YouTube milestone.

2020–present: Hall of Famer at Wish Music Awards, new label and management, and Signature EP
In January 2020, Morissette was inducted as the first Wish 107.5 Hall of Famer. In November 2020, Morissette released her first co-written and co-produced single "Love You Still" through Underdog Music PH. Co-written with her husband (then fiancé) Dave Lamar and co-produced with Lamar and Xergio Ramos, the song was in English to help promote OPM (Original Pilipino Music) around the world. In December 2020, she released a music video for the song, which charted in 12 countries including the U.S. and U.K. Morissette debuted on Pandora Predictions Chart, and on December 22, 2020, she debuted at number 7 on the Billboard Next Big Sound chart, making her the first female OPM artist to do so. In February 2021, she released another single, "Phoenix", through Underdog, co-written with Lamar and co-produced with Lamar and Ramos. It debuted at number 3 on the iTunes Philippines Chart and became her first co-written original song to hit number 1 on that chart. She also released a music video for the song.

In May 2021, Morissette released a 25th anniversary recording of "Shine", which reintroduced "Shine's" original lyrics composed by Trina Belamide. In August 2021, Morissette released an EP, Signature, with her lead single "Trophy". This was her first EP as a singer-songwriter and co-producer along with Lamar and Ramos and was released under Stages Sessions' label Underdog PH. In October 2021, Morissette became part of the Christian music label from Sony Music Philippines, Waterwalk Records. She then released her first single from that record label, "Waterwalk", written by Jungee Marcelo.

Morissette celebrated her tenth anniversary in the music industry through a virtual concert titled "Phoenix", held on KTX on January 23–24, 2022. The concert highlighted her performances through the years. The show was repeated on February 5, 2022. She also joined NYMA Talent Management in 2022. In February 2022, Morissette's rendition of "Gusto Ko Nang Bumitaw" appeared on the soundtrack of The Broken Marriage Vow. It also peaked at the No. 1 spot on iTunes Philippines. A digital concert for The Broken Marriage Vow was given on April 29, 2022, on KTX.PH, featuring the series' stars including Morissette. 

In April 2022, Morissette, Christian Bautista and Erik Santos, gave a tour together, titled "Threelogy", in US. Upon her return to the Philippines, Morissette performed an original song, "Power", at the Miss Universe Philippines 2022 pageant; written by Salazar, it was released on July 15, 2022. Also in July 2022, Morissette became one of the Jukebosses of the Kids edition of Sing Galing on TV5.

In August 2022, Morissette released her first English-Bisaya track entitled "Undangon Ta Ni", under Underdog, composed and produced by Cebu-based songwriters Relden Campanilla, Carlisle Tabanera, and Ferdinand Aragon, along with Morissette and Lamar. Her rendition of Christian Bautista's "Colour Everywhere" was released in October 2022, on digital music platforms.

Personal life
Morissette and Dave Lamar were married on June 28, 2021. Leading up to their marriage, on December 21, 2020, Morissette wrote on Instagram, "More than just an 11:11 wish, you're an answered prayer. I love you @davejlamar, always have and always will". Morissette, when 24, said that the proposal happened a few months ago, with friends and family the first to know. "Nine years since we've met, bestfriends for seven, our second round at love, each other's firsts... and now, last and only... It's definitely a Y E S to a forever with you!" she added. Morissette and Dave were both on The Voice of the Philippines Season 1 in 2013. They married in 2021, which Morissette captioned on their wedding video "We are so happy to finally officially announce that WE ARE MARRIED! it was so hard trying to keep this a secret for the past several months, but we're finally Free!"

Vocal profile
One of Morissette's most distinctive vocal features is her ability to sing in the whistle register with ease. Morissette revealed in an interview that Mariah Carey served as an inspiration to develop her talent in whistling, and to date she has done numerous performances of Mariah's songs. To showcase her talent, Morissette occasionally adds whistle notes when doing covers, and songs from her debut album also include whistles. Another distinctive feature is her use of intentional vocal breaks, which sound like high-pitched squeaks. This technique is used by some singers to add expression to their singing. Morissette is an admirer of the vocal performances of Mariah Carey and has also credited the influence of Shoshana Bean, Cynthia Erivo, Chandler Moore and Tasha Cobbs.

Cast as one of ASAP's "Birit" Queens (literally "Belter" Queens), most of her performances revolve around songs that require belting. This has led her to being described as a power belter. However, Morissette has commented that she wants to go beyond her stereotype as a belter, and has taken some opportunities to do so by performing songs not usually identified with her, such as in her debut solo concert and her Stages Sessions mini-concert.

Jonathan Manalo, the head of Star Records' audio content, has been quoted as saying "Morissette is not just like any traditional diva who can hit high notes. She has a very distinct tone that can adapt to many music genres. And that versatility is something that we will showcase in her debut album with us". Morissette's record company asked her to include some whistle tones in her debut album.

Shows Abroad
 Hong Kong 2011 with Sir Louie Ocampo, Sam Concepcion and Nikki Gil
 ASAP Live in Dubai 2014
 ASAP Live in Los Angeles 2014
 TFC Live presents Martin N. in Doha, Qatar 2014
 Barrio Festival in London 2015 with various Kapamilya Artists
 Pistahan sa San Francisco 2015 (22nd Annual Pistahan Parade and Festival) with Geneva Cruz, Matteo Guidicelli and Matthew John Ignacio in San Francisco, California
 Abu Dhabi 2015 with Daniel Matsunaga and Giselle Sanchez
 TFC One Kapamilya Go 2015 USA with Pangako Sa'yo casts at Oakland Oracle Arena, San Francisco, California
 MOR Live in Taiwan 2016 with Enchong Dee
 One Kapamilya Go Toronto 2016 with Dolce Amore casts at Hershey Center Toronto July 23, 2016
 Morissette Live at Bahrain, July 29, 2016, Ramee Rose Hotel
 ASAP Live in New York, September 3, 2016 Barclays Center, Brooklyn, New York, (Birit Queens)
 ASAP Live in Toronto, July 29, 2017 Ricoh Coliseum, Toronto, Ontario, Canada (Birit Queens)
 ASAP Live in Honolulu, June 30, 2018, Neal S Blaisdell Arena, Honolulu, Hawaii, USA
 TFC OPM Overload, April 5, 2019, with Ogie Alcasid and Piolo Pascual in Dubai World Trade Center, Dubai, UAE
 ASAP Live in Bay Area, August 3, 2019, SAP Center, San Jose, California, USA
 ASAP Live in Rome, November 16, 2019, Palazzo dello Sport, Rome, Italy
 Pinoy Piyesta 2022, September 2, 2022, with Ethel Booba, Erik Santos, K Brosas, KZ Tandingan, and Yeng Constantino in Coca-Cola Arena, Dubai, UAE

Discography

Studio albums

Extended plays

Singles

Soundtracks

Filmography

Acting credits

As herself

Music videos

Concerts

Supporting acts

Awards and nominations
Awards, nominations and recognitions received by Morissette:

Notes

References

External links
 Morissette on Spotify
 Morissette on Apple Music
 Morissette's channel on YouTube
 
 Morissette sings "Imagine More" for the launch of Disney+ in the Philippines (2022)

1996 births
Living people
ABS-CBN personalities
TV5 (Philippine TV network) personalities
Star Magic personalities
Star Music artists
The Voice of the Philippines contestants
Visayan people
People from Cebu City
Actresses from Cebu
Singers from Cebu City
Participants in Philippine reality television series
Filipino child actresses
Filipino television actresses
Filipino child singers
Filipino singer-songwriters
21st-century women singers
21st-century Filipino women
21st-century Filipino singers
21st-century Filipino women singers
Filipino women pop singers
English-language singers from the Philippines
Filipino dance musicians
Filipino female models